Joyner Michelle Holmes (born February 22, 1998) is an American professional basketball player for the Connecticut Sun in the Women's National Basketball Association (WNBA). She has played for the New York Liberty and the Las Vegas Aces. She played college basketball for the Texas Longhorns.

High school career
Holmes played high school basketball for Cedar Hill High School. In her senior year, she averaged 24.8 points per game, 8.1 rebounds per game, 2.4 assists per game, 2.6 steals per game and 0.8 blocks per game. She was named Co-MVP of the 2016 Jordan Brand Classic game.  She  participated in the 2016 McDonald’s All-American game and she was ranked No. 3 by ESPN HoopGurlz in the 2016 recruiting class.

College career
Holmes attended the University of Texas, where she played for the Longhorns women's basketball team, In her freshman season, she averaged 12.1 points, 8.2 rebounds and 1.9 assists per game. In her Sophomore season, she averaged 6.8 points, 6.0 rebounds and 1.4 assists per game. In her junior year, she averaged 11.8 points, 6.7 rebounds and 1.7 assists per game. In her senior year, she averaged 13.1 points, 8.7 rebounds and 2 assists per game.

Texas statistics

Source

Professional career
On April 17, 2020, the Seattle Storm selected Holmes as the 19th pick in the second round of the 2020 WNBA Draft.

On June 26, 2020, Holmes signed with the New York Liberty.

WNBA career statistics

Regular season 

|-
| style="text-align:left;"| 2020
| style="text-align:left;"| New York
| 19 || 0 || 10.0 || .306 || .107 || .750 || 2.7 || 0.7 || 0.1 || 0.1 || 0.7 || 2.9
|-
| style="text-align:left;"| 2021
| style="text-align:left;"| New York
| 1 || 0 || 5.0 || .000 || .000 || .000 || 0.0 || 1.0 || 0.0 || 0.0 || 1.0 || 0.0
|-
| style="text-align:left;"| 2021
| style="text-align:left;"| Las Vegas
| 4 || 0 || 5.8 || .500 || .750 || .000 || 1.0 || 0.5 || 0.0 || 0.3 || 0.3 || 3.3
|-
| style="text-align:left;"| 2022
| style="text-align:left;"| Connecticut
| 26 || 0 || 7.9 || .311 || .227 || .769 || 1.3 || 0.5 || 0.3 || 0.1 || 0.7 || 2.0
|-
| style="text-align:left;"| Career
| style="text-align:left;"| 3 years, 3 teams
| 50 || 0 || 8.5 || .322 || .204 || .760 || 1.8 || 0.6 || 0.2 || 0.1 || 0.7 || 2.4

Playoffs

|-
| style="text-align:left;"| 2022
| style="text-align:left;"| Connecticut
| 7 || 0 || 4.1 || .500 || .000 || 1.000 || 1.3 || 0.7 || 0.1 || 0.0 || 0.1 || 0.9
|-
| style="text-align:left;"| Career
| style="text-align:left;"| 1 year, 1 team
| 7 || 0 || 4.1 || .500 || .000 || 1.000 || 1.3 || 0.7 || 0.1 || 0.0 || 0.1 || 0.9

National team career
Holmes helped the United States under-17 team win a gold medal at the 2014 FIBA U-17 World Championship, She averaged 10.6 points, 5.7 rebounds and 1 assist per game. She also won a silver medal at the 2017 FIBA Under-19 Women's Basketball World Cup with the United States under-19 team, and she averaged 9 points, 8.7 rebounds and 1.9 assists per game.

References

1998 births
Living people
American women's basketball players
Basketball players from Texas
Connecticut Sun players
McDonald's High School All-Americans
New York Liberty players
People from Cedar Hill, Texas
Power forwards (basketball)
Seattle Storm draft picks
Texas Longhorns women's basketball players